Chris Hall (born 3 March 1982) is a former Australian rules footballer who played with Port Adelaide in the Australian Football League (AFL) in 2003.

Both of Hall's games in the AFL were against .

He later played for Subiaco in the West Australian Football League (WAFL) between 2006 and 2008, winning the Simpson Medal as the best player in Subiaco's 2008 Grand Final win.

References

External links

Living people
1982 births
Australian rules footballers from South Australia
Port Adelaide Football Club players
Port Adelaide Football Club players (all competitions)
South Adelaide Football Club players
Subiaco Football Club players
Hackham Football Club players